Jan Hampel (25 April 1933 – 3 December 1962), was a Polish former ice hockey player. He played for GKS Katowice during his career. He also played for the Polish national team at the 1952 Winter Olympics.

References

External links

1933 births
1975 deaths
GKS Katowice (ice hockey) players
Ice hockey players at the 1952 Winter Olympics
Olympic ice hockey players of Poland
Polish ice hockey goaltenders
Sportspeople from Katowice